Colonel Fielding Hudson Garrison, MD (November 5, 1870 – April 18, 1935) was an acclaimed medical historian, bibliographer, and librarian of medicine.  Garrison's An Introduction to the History of Medicine (1913) is a landmark text in this field.

Biography
Garrison was born in Washington, D.C. and received his A.B. in 1890 from the Johns Hopkins University and his M.D. in 1893 from Georgetown University. The son of U.S. Treasury Comptroller John Rowzee Garrison and noted Washington, D.C. civic volunteer Catherine Jane Jennie Davis, he married Clara Augusta Brown in 1910 in Washington, D.C. and they eventually had three daughters. (Garrison was brother-in-law — they married sisters in a double wedding — to Henry Campbell Black, author of "Black's Law Dictionary.)

Garrison joined the staff of the Army Medical Library as a clerk in 1891. (The AML was to become the National Library of Medicine many years after Garrison's death.) He became Assistant Librarian in 1899 and Principal Assistant Librarian in 1912. He joined the Officers Reserve Corps as a Major in 1917 (Lieutenant Colonel, 1918 and Colonel, 1920). Garrison was assigned to index medical literature. In this he worked closely with John Shaw Billings. He helped create and compile the Index-Catalogue of the Library of the Surgeon General's Office. His editorial responsibilities also included the Index Medicus, of which he was Associate Editor (1903–1912) and Editor (1912–1927). He was also Associate Editor of the Quarterly Cumulative Index Medicus for 1927–1929.  Garrison wrote the first comprehensive treatise on the history of medicine and "gained recognition as the foremost American authority on the subject" (according to the Dictionary of American Biography). He prepared plans and collected material for the history of the U.S. Army Medical Department during World War I. In all, he served on staff at the AML for almost 40 years.

From 1930, Garrison was lecturer in the history of medicine and librarian of the Welch Medical Library of the Johns Hopkins University. He was also a much-respected editor and translator, as well as an accomplished classical pianist.

Garrison died April 18, 1935 in Washington, D.C. and is buried in Arlington National Cemetery, Arlington VA.

Positions, honors and accolades
Presidency, American Association for the History of Medicine
Presidency, Medical Library Association
Directorship, Johns Hopkins Institute of the History of Medicine (for one year following the retirement of William H. Welch)
Consulting Librarian, New York Academy of Medicine (1925–30)
Fellow, American College of Surgeons

Legacy
Garrison was a close friend of noted literary critic H. L. Mencken, with whom he exchanged 400 letters, some of which have been published in Mencken's collected letters. Mencken was a pallbearer at Garrison's funeral.
Garrison was the subject of two biographies by Solomon Kagan, and the April, 1937 issue of The Bulletin of the History of Medicine was devoted to essays about Garrison's life and contributions.
Garrison's book Introduction to the History of Medicine was the first comprehensive American publication on the history of medicine. For this book he compiled a bibliography of major works in the history of medicine. This listing, later amended by Leslie Morton, was eventually published as a separate piece. Garrison and Morton's A Medical Bibliography is still widely regarded as a standard in medical historical bibliography.
Garrison's portrait hangs in the History of Medicine Division Reading Room of the United States National Library of Medicine, Bethesda, MD where most of his papers have been deposited.

Bibliography

Books

2nd Edition, 1917.
3rd Edition, revised and enlarged; Philadelphia: W.B. Saunders Co, 1921.

Garrison, Fielding H. (1933/1943), A Medical Bibliography (amended by Leslie Morton)

Journals

References

Further reading 
Garrison, F.H. (1932), "A Lucubration on the Caduceus", Mil. Surg., 71:129–32.
"Fielding Hudson Garrison" [Obituary] (1935), JAMA, 104:1540.
Kagan, S.R. (1938), Life and Letters of Fielding H. Garrison, Boston: Medico-Historical Press.
Arnold, Jr., H.L. (1943), Fielding H. Garrison, the Caduceus and the United States Army Medical Department, Bull. Hist. Med., 13:627-30 [Contains a 1935 letter from Garrison to Arnold].

External links 
 
The Fielding H. Garrison Collection

1870 births
1935 deaths
Burials at Arlington National Cemetery
American medical historians
Georgetown University School of Medicine alumni
Johns Hopkins University alumni
United States Army Medical Corps officers
 American librarians